Barry Whitbread (born c. 1949) is an English former football player and coach who led the Singapore national football team to the country's first ever international trophy in football, the 1998 AFF Championship.

Club career
Whitbread played football as a forward for Lancaster City in the Northern Premier League while a student at Lancaster University. He scored a hat-trick on his debut for the club, and scored their early goal in what became a 2–1 defeat to Football League opponents Notts County in the first round proper of the 1972–73 FA Cup. Transferred nearer home for a fee of £250, Whitbread's 29 goals helped Runcorn to the Northern Premier League title in the 1975–76 season. After scoring 181 career goals for Runcorn, he joined Altrincham in 1979 for a club record fee of £6,400. He helped the club reach the 1982 FA Trophy final, in which he made his final appearance as a player, on the losing side.

International career
Whitbread was a member of the first ever England team at semi-professional level. He won six caps, scoring twice, between 1979 and 1981.

Coaching career
Whitbread trained as a teacher before moving into football management, having gained his coaching qualifications while still a player. He was assistant manager of Northwich Victoria, then manager of Runcorn from 1988 to 1990, and also coached in the United States. He took the job as Singapore national football team coach in 1996. Two years later, his team written off before it started, Whitbread led Singapore to victory in the 1998 Tiger Cup (now known as the AFF Suzuki Cup), their first ever success in an international football competition.

On his return to England he worked at Liverpool's Youth Academy, becoming head of recruitment, a post he held until 2007. He went on to act as chief scout for clubs including Blackburn Rovers and Bolton Wanderers.

Personal life
His son Zak, born in Houston, Texas, while Whitbread was working in the US, became a professional footballer after developing in the Liverpool academy. Zak played for Shrewsbury Town.

References

External links
 Profile at Runcorn Linnets F.C. website
 Legends (including Whitbread) at Lancaster City F.C. website

1940s births
Living people
English footballers
Association football forwards
Lancaster City F.C. players
Runcorn F.C. Halton players
Altrincham F.C. players
National League (English football) players
English football managers
Runcorn F.C. Halton managers
Singapore national football team managers
Liverpool F.C. non-playing staff
Bolton Wanderers F.C. non-playing staff
Blackburn Rovers F.C. non-playing staff
English expatriate football managers
English expatriate sportspeople in Singapore
Expatriate football managers in Singapore
English expatriate sportspeople in the United States
Expatriate soccer managers in the United States
Association football coaches